Oxoniae or Oxoniai was an ancient Greek town and polis (city-state) of Magnesia located in the region of Thessaly. The name is not attested by the demonym (Ὀξωνιαῖος) is in an inscription dated to 358 BCE. Its current location has not been found.

References

Sources

Populated places in ancient Thessaly
Former populated places in Greece
Thessalian city-states
Lost ancient cities and towns
Ancient Magnesia
Cities in ancient Greece